Words and Music is the twelfth and to date final album by American soul/R&B group Tavares, released by RCA in 1983.  The album contains a top 10 R&B single in "Deeper in Love".  The single, "Words and Music", peaked at #29 on the R&B chart.

Track listing 
 "Ten to One" (Isaias Gamboa, Joey Gallo, Leon Sylvers III) - 6:06 
 "Deeper in Love" (Dana Meyers, Dominick Leslie, Wardell Potts) - 4:52  
 "Caught Short" (Dana Marshall, Dana Meyers, Ronald E. Parker) - 5:06  
 "(You're) My All in All" (Dana Marshall, Dana Meyers, Ralph Edward Clayborn, Ronald E. Parker) - 5:41  
 "Words and Music" (Kenny Nolan) - 4:42  
 "Baby I Want You Back" (Kris Young, Richard Wyatt, Jr.) - 4:43  
 "I Really Miss You Baby" (Kris Young, Richard Wyatt, Jr.) - 4:35  
 "Don't Play So Hard to Get" (Kris Young, Richard Wyatt, Jr.) - 4:00  
 "Us and Love (We Go Together)" (Kenny Nolan) - 4:10

Singles 
 "Deeper in Love" (US R&B #10)
 "Words and Music" (US R&B #29)

Tavares (group) albums
1983 albums
RCA Records albums
Albums produced by Leon Sylvers III